César Nicolás Fuentes González (born 12 April 1993) is a Chilean footballer that currently plays for Primera División club Colo-Colo as a midfielder.

Career

Youth career

Fuentes started his career at Primera División de Chile club O'Higgins. He progressed from the under categories club all the way to the senior team.

O'Higgins

In 2012, Fuentes was runner-up with O'Higgins, after lose the final against Universidad de Chile in the penalty shoot-out.

Fuentes won the Apertura 2013-14 with O'Higgins. In the tournament, he played in 15 of 18 matches.

In 2014, he won the Supercopa de Chile against Deportes Iquique, playing the 90 minutes of this match that O'Higgins won at the penalty shoot-out.

He participated with the club in the 2014 Copa Libertadores where they faced Deportivo Cali, Cerro Porteño and Lanús, being third and being eliminated in the group stage.

Universidad Catolica
On 12 June 2015, Fuentes signed for 4 years with Universidad Católica.

Colo Colo
On 17 December 2019, Fuentes signs a contract with Colo Colo on a loan term with probable buyout.

International career

He was part of the Chile national under-20 football team, who played the 2013 South American Youth Championship in Argentina and joined the first team for the 2013 FIFA U-20 World Cup based in Turkey, where they reached the quarter-finals.

Honors

Club
O'Higgins
Primera División de Chile (1): 2013–A
Supercopa de Chile (1): 2014

Universidad Catolica
Primera División de Chile (4): 2016–A, 2016–C, 2018, 2019
 Supercopa de Chile (2): 2016, 2019

Colo Colo

Individual
 Medalla Santa Cruz de Triana: 2014

References

External links
 César Fuentes at Football-Lineups
 
 

1993 births
Living people
Chilean footballers
Chile under-20 international footballers
Chilean Primera División players
O'Higgins F.C. footballers
Club Deportivo Universidad Católica footballers
Colo-Colo footballers
Association football midfielders
People from Rancagua